North Raleigh United Methodist Church is a United Methodist church in northern Raleigh, North Carolina, located at 8501 Honeycutt Road. It is a member of the North Carolina Annual Conference and is under the jurisdiction of Bishop Hope Morgan Ward. The North Raleigh United Methodist Church is currently led by Senior Pastor Duke Lackey, Associate Pastor Alex Parker, and Pastor Emeritus Ken Klingborg

History
In the spring of 1971, thirteen families met and discussed the area's need for a church. The meeting place for the church became Monk Chapel, on the grounds of the Methodist Home For Children. Four rotating ministers were assigned by the local bishop to preside over the church. Soon church organizations, including the United Methodist Women's & Methodist Men's Organization and the Council of Ministries, were installed. In June 1972, Sidney Huggins was assigned by the bishop as the first permanent minister of the church.

The congregation purchased seven acres of land on Honeycutt Road in Raleigh with financial assistance from the Raleigh Board of Missions, North Carolina Conference, the North Carolina Ten Dollar Club, and the Duke Endowment Fund. The first sanctuary was built in September 1972. A second sanctuary was completed in March 1983, and the education building was completed in 1987. The current sanctuary was consecrated in February 2006. The church grounds now include the staff offices, sanctuary, fellowship hall, music suite, kitchen, classrooms, conference room, youth center and education building/NRUM Preschool.

The Senior Pastor is Duke Lackey and the former Associate Pastor was Ashley Will. Both were appointed in June 2017 and started these appointments on July 2, 2017. The Executive Pastor, Alan Felton, is an appointed pastor. He is responsible for the overall leadership and direction of both ministry and administrative staff, leading all functional areas in the accomplishment of the church’s mission.

Church Interior

Sanctuary
The church's sanctuary has many stained glass windows, which were paid for by parishioners as gifts to the church. The sanctuary (including chancel area) sits approximately 600, with wooden pews. The front of the sanctuary contains the altar completed with an altar cross, a baptismal font, and the pulpit. Behind the pulpit and font are the minister's and acolyte's chairs, and at the sides of the altar are altar candles. Behind the minister's chairs, is the choir loft, grand piano and organ. Above the choir is the largest stained glass window, flanked by organ pipes on either side. The right and left sides of the chancel area accommodate two handbell-choir setups. Behind the chancel is the sacristy, where the elements for the Sacrament of the Holy Eucharist are kept.

Church windows
The sanctuary of North Raleigh United Methodist Church contains large stained glass windows. The largest window is located above the altar in the chancel area and contains three panels. One panel depicts the resurrected Christ holding the Rod of Aaron and appearing to Mary Magdalene. The second panel depicts the empty tomb of Christ. The third panel displays the story of the risen Christ encountering two men on the road to Emmaus. Stained glass windows on the left wall of the church show Adam and Eve in the Garden of Eden, the Binding of Isaac, Moses with the Ten Commandments, and King David with the Ark of the Covenant. The windows on the right wall depict the life of Christ through the Nativity, Jesus' baptism, Jesus with the Samaritan Woman at the Well, Jesus teaching the children, and Jesus approaching Jerusalem on what is known as Palm Sunday.

Music Ministry
The music ministry is composed of vocal choirs, handbell and chime choirs, and a contemporary band, plus orchestras for special services. Two staff musicians oversee a program of approximately 200 participants, with many volunteer assistants and directors.

The church houses a combination digital/pipe organ. It also has a piano, and handbells and chimes.

Youth Ministry
The youth department is subdivided into two individual youth groups, separated between high school and middle school age groups. The high school youth group went up to New York City in July 2009 on a mission trip, where they were hosted by the United Methodist Church of Saint Paul and Saint Andrew. In the summer of 2010, both youth groups embarked to Nashville, Tennessee on a mission trip, where they were led by Students Living A Mission. The youth group is a regular attendee of StudentLife Camp at Lee University in Cleveland, Tennessee. Jen Haselden serves as the Director of Youth Ministry.

Organizations
The Church currently hosts pre-school classes, the Boy Scouts of America Troop 318, and is an active member of Stephen Ministries.

References

Churches in Raleigh, North Carolina
United Methodist churches in North Carolina
20th-century Methodist church buildings
Churches completed in 1972
20th-century Methodist church buildings in the United States